The discography of American rapper Quavo consists of one studio album, two collaborative albums (one with Travis Scott and one with Takeoff), 18 singles as the lead artist, 33 other songs including charted ones and guest appearances.

Quavo has been featured on four singles that have peaked within the top 10 of the Billboard Hot 100, including DJ Khaled's "I'm the One" and "No Brainer" the former of which reached number one, along with "Congratulations", which peaked at number 8 on the Billboard Hot 100. On October 12, 2018, he released his debut solo album, Quavo Huncho, which peaked at number two on the Billboard 200.

Albums

Studio albums

Collaborative albums

Extended plays

Singles

As lead artist

As featured artist

Promotional singles

Other charted songs

Guest appearances

See also 
 Migos discography
 Offset discography
 Takeoff discography

Notes

References 

Discographies of American artists